Bahrain International Challenge is an open international badminton tournament in Bahrain established in 2008. This tournament presented by the Bahrain Badminton and Squash Federation, and sanctioned by Badminton World Federation and Badminton Asia. This tournament has been a BWF International Challenge level, and a part of Bahrain International Badminton Festival. Another tournament on Bahrain Festival is Bahrain International.

Previous winners

Performances by countries

References 

Badminton tournaments in Bahrain